The Dutch Zoo Federation (Nederlandse Vereniging van Dierentuinen - NVD) is an association of 15 large zoos in the Netherlands. NVD was founded in 1966. All of its member zoos are members of the European Association of Zoos and Aquaria (EAZA).

Dutch member zoos

Current 
Apenheul in Apeldoorn 
Aqua Zoo Friesland in Leeuwarden
Artis in Amsterdam
Burgers' Zoo in Arnhem
DierenPark Amersfoort in Amersfoort
Wildlands Adventure Zoo Emmen in Emmen
Dierenrijk in Mierlo
Diergaarde Blijdorp in Rotterdam
GaiaPark Kerkrade Zoo in Kerkrade
Ouwehands Dierenpark in Rhenen
Safaripark Beekse Bergen in Hilvarenbeek
Zoo Park Overloon in Overloon

Former 

 Dolfinarium Harderwijk in Harderwijk (expelled in 2019 due to reports of animal abuse)

See also
 List of zoo associations

External links
 NVD homepage

Zoo associations
Animal welfare organisations based in the Netherlands